Justice Watson may refer to:

Albert Watson (Illinois judge), associate justice of the Illinois Supreme Court
Edward B. Watson, chief justice of the Oregon Supreme Court
Edward M. Watson, associate justice of the Supreme Court of Hawaii
Jack C. Watson, associate justice of the Louisiana Supreme Court
James F. Watson, associate justice of the Oregon Supreme Court
John C. Watson (judge), associate justice of the New Mexico Supreme Court
John H. Watson (Vermont judge), chief justice of the Vermont Supreme Court
John Hampton Watson, associate justice of the Kansas Supreme Court
John T. Watson, associate justice of the New Mexico Supreme Court

See also
Judge Watson (disambiguation)